The BARLA Yorkshire Cup is a knock-out rugby league competition for amateur teams in the traditional county of Yorkshire. It is administered by the British Amateur Rugby League Association (BARLA). The winners of the most recent staging of the competition in 2019 are Lock Lane.

Between 1905 and 1993, a Yorkshire County Cup was competed for by the professional sides.

Winners

See also

Rugby league county cups
BARLA National Cup
CMS Yorkshire league
Pennine League
Hull & District League

References

External links 
 BARLA Official Website

Rugby league competitions in Yorkshire
BARLA competitions